Dafydd Hellard (born 21 February 1985) is a Welsh rugby league footballer, and coach.

Background
Dafydd Hellard was born in Aberdare, Wales.

Player 
Hellard came through the youth ranks at Cardiff Blues before turning out for Merthyr and Rhymney. He switched to rugby league in 2008 when he joined Valley Cougars. By 2010 he had represented Wales with the Wales Dragonhearts team, but the season ended in disaster when he suffered knee ligament damage which would keep him out until 2012. South Wales Hornets the feeder team to the South Wales Scorpions signed him up after his long lay off. In 2013 he moved back to his former club Valley Cougars helping them to reach the South Wales Conference Grand final. The 2014 season saw Hellard sign for semi-professional side South Wales Scorpions in Championship 1 being dual-registered, so he could still play for Valley Cougars where he was captain, when not picked for the Scorpions. By the end of the season he had won the Conference League South title with the Cougars and made 11 appearances with the Scorpions scoring one try in Championship 1. 2015 saw him play 15 games for South Wales Scorpions, and 6 games for Valley Cougars

Coach 
For season 2015 Hellard was promoted to player coach of Valley Cougars guiding them to the Conference League South Grand final where he scored a try but they lost the game to Nottingham Outlaws

Sources 
 South Wales Scorpions players

External links 
 Wales Rugby League website
 South Wales Scorpions website
 Conference League South website
 Valley Cougars website

1985 births
Living people
Merthyr RFC players

Rugby articles needing expert attention
Rugby league players from Aberdare
Rugby league wingers
Rugby union players from Aberdare
South Wales Scorpions players

Welsh rugby league coaches
Welsh rugby league players